Malak Sukkar (27 December 1946 – 18 November 1992) was a Syrian pioneer actress.

Background 
Malak Sukkar was born in Damascus in 1930. She started her acting career in 1964. She appeared in 38 Syrian films. At the age of 62, she died of cardiovascular disease in 1992.

Selected filmography 
 Abu Kamel (1991)
 Al-Kheshkhash' (1991)
 Hasad Al-sanin (1985)
 Maraya (1982)
 Al Haras (1981)
 Sari (1977)
 Bentol Badiah'' (1972)

References

1946 births
1992 deaths
Syrian film actresses
Syrian television actresses
20th-century Syrian actresses
People from Damascus
Place of death missing